Europ Decor was a Belgian professional cycling team that existed from 1982 to 1984. It participated in the 1984 Tour de France; Frank Hoste won the points classification and three stages, and Alfons De Wolf won a stage.

Major wins 

1982
Jan Bogaert
E3 Prijs Harelbeke 
Stage 2 and 3 Herald Sun Tour
 
1983
Frank Hoste
Stage 16A Giro d'Italia
Stages 1, 2 and 8 Tour de Suisse
Jan Bogaert
Scheldeprijs
Jos Jacobs
Stage 4 Vuelta a Andalucía
Marc Sergeant
2nd Road Race Belgian Championships
3rd Tour of Flanders
 
 
1984
Fons De Wolf
Stage 14 Tour de France
Stage 6 Tour of Norway
Stage 1 Tour de Romandie
Stage 3 Vuelta a Andalucía
Frank Hoste
Stages 1, 6 and 21 Tour de France
 Points classification
Grand Prix de Wallonie
Hasselt-Spa-Hasselt
Gerrie Knetemann
Grand Prix Pino Cerami
Luc Govaerts
Stage 10 Herald Sun Tour
 Marc Sergeant
 Stage 5, Tour de Suisse
 2nd Overall Tour of Belgium

References

Cycling teams based in Belgium
Defunct cycling teams based in Belgium
1982 establishments in Belgium
1984 disestablishments in Belgium
Cycling teams established in 1982
Cycling teams disestablished in 1984